Sandness (the "d" is not pronounced locally) is a headland and district in the west of Shetland Mainland, Scotland. Sandness was a civil parish, which also included the island of Papa Stour some 1600 metres northwest across Papa Sound. In 1891, it was combined with Walls to the south, to form Walls and Sandness Parish, which had an administrative function until the abolition of Civil parishes in Scotland by the Local Government (Scotland) Act 1929, and had been a statistical regional unit since. Currently, the community council area of Sandness and Walls covers about the same area. The 1878 map of Sandness Parish shows that the parish to the east was Aithsting, before it was included into Sandsting to the south.

The headland flanks the south side of Papa Sound near Papa Stour leading into St Magnus Bay and the district includes the headland and forms the mainland part of Walls parish. The land itself is fairly fertile for Shetland and runs from Bousta to Huxter, with Norby and Melby in the middle.

It has three churches, with only two still in use, with the other being privately owned and used as a shed. It has no village shop. The nearest one is just south of the village in Walls.

The village has approximately 160 residents and 75 inhabited houses.

The  summit of Sandness Hill lies south of the village.

The village has a number of small businesses, including a bed and breakfast, a leather worker, a woolen mill, a baker, as well as Britain's most northerly vegbox scheme.

Notable people
Christina Jamieson who was a local writer and suffragist was born here in 1864.

References

 The original article is based on  Wilson, Rev. John The Gazetteer of Scotland (Edinburgh, 1882) Published by W. & A.K. Johnstone

Parishes of Shetland
Landforms of Shetland
Headlands of Scotland
Villages in Mainland, Shetland